The Airdrome Sopwith Baby is an American amateur-built aircraft, designed and produced by Airdrome Aeroplanes, of Holden, Missouri. The aircraft is supplied as a kit for amateur construction.

The aircraft is a full-scale replica of the First World War British Sopwith Baby scout/bomber. The replica is built from modern materials and powered by modern engines.

Design and development
The Airdrome Sopwith Baby features a strut-braced biplane layout, a single-seat open cockpit, fixed conventional landing gear with auxiliary skids and a single engine in tractor configuration.

The aircraft is made from bolted-together aluminum tubing, with its flying surfaces covered in doped aircraft fabric. The standard engine used is the  four stroke Rotec R2800 radial engine. Building time from the factory-supplied kit is estimated at 450 hours by the manufacturer.

Operational history
One example had been completed by December 2011.

Specifications (Sopwith Baby)

References

Homebuilt aircraft
Single-engined tractor aircraft